Mandy Ingber (born January 11th, 1968 ), sometimes credited as Amanda Ingber, is a yoga instructor and a former actress. Before yoga, Ingber became an indoor cycling instructor at the age of 28. In her childhood, she was introduced to yoga by her father in 1975. As a yoga instructor, she has produced instructional training DVDs such as Yogalosophy.

She is a New York Times best selling author, having written Yogalosophy: 28 Days to the Ultimate Mind-Body Makeover and Yogalosophy for Inner Strength.  Ingber has taught yoga to celebrities such as Jennifer Aniston, Ricki Lake, Brooke Shields, Woody Harrelson and Helen Hunt.

Acting career 
Ingber began her career as an actress in the original company of Neil Simon's Tony-award winning play Brighton Beach Memoirs and has played roles in television series, including being Annie Tortelli, girlfriend of the eldest son of Carla, on the television sitcom Cheers and its short-lived spin-off The Tortellis. She also played Robin, Baby's cousin, in the 1988 television series adaptation of the film Dirty Dancing.

Her other roles include Enid, Lila Pembroke's friend in the first season of Charles in Charge and Polly Goldenberg-Cohen in the 1989 cult classic Teen Witch.

References

External links 
 
 

Living people
American television actresses
20th-century American actresses
American yoga teachers
Year of birth missing (living people)
1960s births
21st-century American women